The Rooms Katholieke Voetbalvereniging Minor is a Dutch association football club from Nuth. Its colors are green-white. Home grounds are at Sportpark De Kollenberg. Its prime team plays in the Hoofdklasse since 2018.

History
The club was founded on June 27, 1918 at the Vaesrader Voetbal Club (VVC). In 1922 the name was changed to Minor. Minor reached a high in 1966 when, unbeaten over an entire football season, took a championship in the Eerste Klasse, at the time the highest amateur league.

In 2018, it promoted to the Hoofdklasse after a second Eerste Klasse championship. In 2019, it held on to a place in the Hoofdklasse, finishing the season in 10th position. Also in 2019 it lost 4-2 through penalties in the semifinals for the KNVB South II Cup, against SV TOP, after the game had ended in a 1-1 draw.

References

Association football clubs established in 1918
1918 establishments in the Netherlands
Football clubs in the Netherlands
Football clubs in Limburg (Netherlands)
Sport in Beekdaelen